Pashu may refer to:

Things
 Pashu language, a Malay-based creole patois spoken in Kawthaung, Myanmar (Burma).
 Pterocarpus indicus, a tree and its wood also known as Pashu padauk or Malay padauk.
 Kiasu, a Singlish and Manglish concept referring to niggardly, rude or ungrateful behavior driven by competitive pressure.

Places
 Pashu, Iran, a village in Kermān Province, Iran (Latitude: 28° 44' 2 N, Longitude: 58° 58' 7 E)
 Pashu, Peru, a village in Piura Province, Peru (Latitude: 5° 40' 10 S, Longitude: 79° 32' 34 W)
 Pashu, Zimbabwe, a town in Zimbabwe (Latitude: 18° 13' 0 S, Longitude: 27° 24' E)
 Pashu Rock, a landmark on the coast of Liberia (Latitude: 4° 37' N, Longitude: 8° 20' W)
 Pashu Island, a small island in the Marine National Park, Gulf of Kutch, Gujarat, India
 Mergui Archipelago, sometimes known as the Pashu Islands

People
 Pashu, a Burmese word for the Peranakan or Straits Chinese in Myanmar

See also
 Govind Pashu Vihar, a wildlife sanctuary in Uttarkashi, Uttarakhand, India
 Pashupati, an epithet of Shiva